Kitakata ramen (喜多方ラーメン) is a kind of ramen that originated in Kitakata, Japan.

History 
As 1927, Kitakata ramen originated from Genraiken noodle shop in Kitakata, Fukushima. Kitakata Ramen is one of Japanese's three most popular ramen, along with Sapporo ramen and Hakata ramen. Kitakata city has the most ramen stores per capita.

The ramen has a soy sauce base, and is usually topped with green onions, fish cake, char siu and bamboo shoots. The noodles are also noticeably thicker than the ramen noodles used in other varieties.

References

See also 
Kitakata, Fukushima
Akabeko

Culture in Fukushima Prefecture
Ramen dishes
Kitakata, Fukushima